Oxyceros longiflorus (common name needle flower) is a shrub in the gardenia family (Rubiaceae) found in rainforests of northern South America. It is most noteworthy for its tubular flowers which can be up to 13 inches (32 centimeters) in length while not over one-twelfth inch (two millimeters) in diameter, a 160 fold ratio of length to width, the greatest such ratio found among dry land (non-aquatic) plants.  It is pollinated by a sphinx moth, possibly Amphimoea walkeri (Sphingidae) which has a 28 centimeter (eleven inch) tongue or proboscis.

When a sphinx moth inserts its proboscis into the flower, it touches a trigger mechanism which causes the four lateral stamens (two pairs) to move away from the center, while the middle stamen lunges forward like a catapult coating the lower surface of the moth with pollen. hopefully to pollinate the stigma of the next flower visited. The role of the lateral stamens remains unclear. Most of the literature for this species is under the older name Posoqueria longiflora.

References

Gardenieae
Flora of South America
Taxa named by Takasi Yamazaki